The James Stanley Handford House is a historic house at 659 East Boswell Street in Batesville, Arkansas.  It is a -story wood-frame structure, built in 1888 with elaborate Queen Anne Victorian styling.  It has a wraparound porch with delicate turned posts with brackets and a paneled balustrade.  Its irregular massing includes a front-facing gable and corner polygonal bay, with bands of decorative scalloped shingles on the sides.  The house is a near mirror-image of the Charles Robertson Handford House, located across the street.  Built by two brothers, these houses are fine examples of Victorian architecture, important also for their association with the Handfords, who were prominent in the local lumber business.

The house was listed on the National Register of Historic Places in 1975.

See also
National Register of Historic Places listings in Independence County, Arkansas

References

Houses on the National Register of Historic Places in Arkansas
Queen Anne architecture in Arkansas
Houses in Batesville, Arkansas
National Register of Historic Places in Independence County, Arkansas
1888 establishments in Arkansas
Houses completed in 1888